Clear Blue in Stormy Skies is the sixth studio album by New Zealand singer Jenny Morris.  It was released 24 June 2006, by Liberation Blue Records. It is a collection of Morris' remodelled radio hits of the 1980s and 1990s, including a retake of "You I Know", rewritten by its original songwriter, Neil Finn, an instrumental arrangement of her most requested song, "Little Little", and a cover of INXS' song, "This Time", in tribute to her friend Michael Hutchence. The one new song, "This Time", contains the album's title as a lyric.

Clear Blue in Stormy Skies was recorded in February 2006 with members of her backing band, Steve Balbi (Noiseworks, Electric Hippies) who co-produced; Paul Searles (Skunkhour) and Josh Quong Tart.

Morris' vocals were recorded on a vintage valve microphone once used by Frank Sinatra.

Track listing
 "Break in the Weather" (J. Morris, T. Morris)
 "Everywhere I Go" (J. Morris, T. Backhouse)
 "You I Know" (N. Finn)
 "The Time" (J. Morris, S.Balbi)
 "She Has to Be Loved" (J. Morris, A. Farriss) 
 "This Time" (A. Farriss)
 "Street of Love" (P. Kelly)
 "Body and Soul" (J. Morris)
 "You're Gonna Get Hurt" (A. Farriss)
 "Rhythm & Flow" (J. Morris) 
 "Tennessee Waltz" (Pee Wee King, R. Stewart) 
 "(Little) Little Little" (J. Morris)

Personnel
 Jenny Morris — vocals, guitar, percussion
 Neil Finn — guitar, backing vocals
 Steve Balbi — Produced by, guitars, double bass, toy drums, backing vocals
 Paul Searles — piano, wurlitzer, organ, hammond organ, Rhodes piano, backing vocals, percussion
 Josh Quong Tart — backing vocals
 Nick Hartley - Additional recording and mixing

References

2006 albums
Jenny Morris (musician) albums